Jesús Leguina Villa (1942 – 14 May 2016) was a Spanish jurist and civil servant. He served as a judge of the Constitutional Court of Spain from 1986 until 1990, having previously served as a member of the General Council of the Judiciary.  He was then selected as a director of the Bank of Spain, serving from 1994 until 2000 and again from 2004 until 2010. He also served as Vice Chancellor of the University of the Basque Country. He was married to María Emilia Casas, a former President of the Constitutional Court, and had four children.

References

1942 births
2016 deaths
20th-century Spanish judges
Academic staff of the University of the Basque Country
Spanish business executives
University of Deusto alumni
People from Bilbao
Academic staff of the University of Alcalá
University of Bologna alumni
Spanish expatriates in Italy
Knights Grand Cross of the Order of Isabella the Catholic